Chamaesphecia palustris is a moth of the family Sesiidae. It is found in France, Italy, Austria, the Czech Republic, Slovakia, Hungary, Croatia, Serbia and Montenegro, Romania, Moldova, Ukraine, Russia and northern Turkey.

The wingspan is 25–29 mm.

The larvae feed on Euphorbia palustris and Euphorbia lucida.

References

Moths described in 1927
Sesiidae
Moths of Europe
Moths of Asia